Carwyn is a Welsh male given name, and may refer to one of the following:

Carwyn Davies (1964–1997), Welsh international rugby union player
Carwyn James (1929–1983), Welsh rugby union player and coach
Carwyn Jones (born 1967), Welsh politician and former First Minister of Wales
Carwyn Williams (born 1965), Welsh surfer

Welsh masculine given names